Vaseline is a trademarked brand of petroleum jelly.

Vaseline may also refer to:
 Petroleum jelly, called by the brand name Vaseline due to trademark genericization

 "Vaseline", a song by Elastica from Elastica
 The Vaselines, a Scottish rock band

See also
 Uranium glass or Vaseline glass
 "Vasoline", a 1994 song by Stone Temple Pilots